Puerta Este will be a station of line 2 of the Seville Metro. It will be located in the intersection of Luis Uruñuela and Luis Bejarano St., in the neighborhood of Seville Este. Puerta Este will be an underground station and will be situated between Luis Uruñuela and Palacio de Congresos on the same line. Construction works will begin in late 2011, and the station is expected to be operational during 2017.

Future services

See also
 List of Seville metro stations

References

External links 
  Official site.
  Map of Line 2 project
 History, construction details and maps.

Seville Metro stations
Railway stations in Spain opened in 2017